Regamey or Régamey is a surname. Notable people with the surname include: 

Constantin Regamey (1907–1982), Swiss philologist, orientalist, musician, composer, and critic
Fabienne Regamey (born 1952), Swiss fencer
Marcel Regamey (1905–1982), Swiss essayist and journalist
Maurice Régamey (1924–2009), Polish-born French actor and film director
Robert-Henri Regamey (1907–1978), Swiss physician and microbiologist